Jack E. Kirksey (born November 21, 1928) is an American former politician from the state of Michigan. He served in the Michigan House of Representatives from 1977 to 1984. Kirksey also served as Assistant  Wayne County Executive from 1985-1987 and mayor of Livonia, Michigan from 1995 to 2003, and from 2008 to 2015.

References

1928 births
Living people
Republican Party members of the Michigan House of Representatives
Mayors of places in Michigan